Tuna Luso Brasileira, commonly referred to as Tuna Luso, is a Brazilian professional football club based in Belém, Pará founded on 1 January 1903. It competes in the Campeonato Brasileiro Série D, the fourth tier of Brazilian football, as well as in the Campeonato Paraense, the top flight of the Pará state football league.

History
Tuna Luso was founded initially as a musical band. It occurred because  the Portuguese cruiser Dom Carlos was going to visit the port of Belém on November 12, 1902. Some Portuguese youths, residing in the city, decided to found a musical band to receive their fellow countrymen. The name they chose to the band was Tuna Luso Caixeiral. Tuna means popular orchestra, Luso means Portuguese, and Caixeiral  means commerce employee. Later, the club changed its name to Tuna Luso Comercial, and years later changed its name again, this time to Tuna Luso Brasileira. The club began entering sports in 1906, when it opened a rowing department. Football was introduced in 1915, but the team only entered the state championship for the first time in 1933.

In 1937, Tuna Luso won its first state championship. In 1985, Tuna Luso won the second division of the Brazilian National Championship. In 1992, Tuna Luso won the third division of the Brazilian National Championship.

Rivals
Tuna Luso greatest rivals are Paysandu and Remo.

Symbols
The club's mascot is an eagle.

Players

Current squad

Honours
 Campeonato Brasileiro Série B (Taça de Prata before 1988)
 Winners (1): 1985

 Campeonato Brasileiro Série C
 Winners (1): 1992

 Campeonato Paraense
 Winners (10): 1937, 1938, 1941, 1948, 1951, 1955, 1958, 1970, 1983, 1988

 Campeonato Paraense Second Division
 Winners (1): 2020

External links
 Official Site
 Tuna Luso on Globo Esporte

Tuna Luso Brasileira
Association football clubs established in 1903
Belém
1903 establishments in Brazil
Campeonato Brasileiro Série C winners